Astrocaryum is a genus of about 36 to 40 species of palms native to Central and South America and Trinidad.

Description
Astrocaryum is a genus of spiny palms with pinnately compound leaves–rows of leaflets emerge on either side of the axis of the leaf in a feather-like or fern-like pattern. Some species are single-stemmed, while others grow in multi-stemmed (caespitose) clumps. They are pleonanthic—they flower repeatedly over the course of their lifespan—and monoecious, meaning that there are separate male and female flowers, but individuals plants bear both types of flowers.

Taxonomy

History
The type species, Astrocaryum aculeatum, was first described by German botanist Georg Friedrich Wilhelm Meyer in 1818 based on a specimen from the Essequibo River in Guyana.

Species

One well known member of the genus is Astrocaryum vulgare, typical in the Pará state of Brazil. Astrocaryum mexicanum, a common palm of the Caribbean coast of Central America, is known as warree cohune in Brazil, as its spines are said to resemble the bristles of the white-lipped peccary or warree.

Uses
The fruit and seeds of several species are used for human food, oil production and fish bait. Leaves are used as a source of fibre and stems as building material. Species are also used medicinally and as a source of palm heart.

References

 
Arecaceae genera
Neotropical realm flora